A double referendum was held in Uruguay on 28 November 1971 alongside general elections. Voters were asked whether they approved of two proposals; one to allow presidents to seek immediate re-election for a second term, and one that would force the President to resign if any government ministers were found guilty of violating the law. Both were rejected by voters.

Proposals
The proposal to allow Presidents to seek immediate re-election for a second term was put forward by the Battlista faction of the Colorado Party in the General Assembly. It had been inspired by the  supporting President Jorge Pacheco Areco.

The proposal to force the President to resign if any government minister was found guilty of violating the law was put forward a popular initiative.

Results

Immediate re-election

Presidential resignation

References

1971 referendums
1971 in Uruguay
Referendums in Uruguay
Constitutional referendums in Uruguay
Reelection
November 1971 events in South America